Events from the year 1686 in art.

Events
 Pierre Granier is commissioned to provide a new right arm for the recently discovered Jupiter de Smyrne.
 Bogdan Saltanov becomes head of the painting workshop of the Kremlin Armoury.

Works

 Benedetto Gennari – The Death of Cleopatra
 Jacques Rousseau – Wall paintings at Montagu House, Bloomsbury (now lost)
 (three artists) – Hanging painting of the Avalokitesvara Bodhisattva (Gwaneumbodhisavtta) at the Geumdangsa, South Korea
 (workshop of Grinling Gibbons) – Statue of James II

Births
 March 7 – Francesco Antonio Xaverio Grue, Italian potter and painter (died 1746)
 March 17 – Jean-Baptiste Oudry, French Rococo painter, engraver and tapestry designer (died 1755)
 May 30 – Antonina Houbraken, Dutch printmaker and drafter (died 1736)
 August 8 – Wenzel Lorenz Reiner, Czech Baroque painter (died 1743)
 August 18 – Peter von Bemmel, German landscape painter and etcher (died 1754)
 August 27 – Agostino Cornacchini, Italian sculptor and painter (died 1754)
 September 29 – Cosmas Damian Asam, German painter and architect during the late Baroque period (died 1739)
 October 15 – Alessandro Galli Bibiena, Italian architect/painter (died 1748)
 date unknown
 Gerhard Bockman, Dutch portrait painter and mezzotint engraver (died 1773)
 Carlo Carlone, Italian painter (died 1775)
 Antonio Consetti, Italian historical painter (died 1766)
 Louise-Magdeleine Horthemels, French engraver (died 1767)
 François Hutin, French painter, sculptor and engraver (died 1758)
 Giovanni Pietro Ligario, Italian painter of historical pictures for churches and private collections (died 1748)
 Okumura Masanobu, Japanese print designer, book publisher and painter (died 1764)
 Wang Shishen, Chinese painter (died 1759)
 Zou Yigui, Chinese Qing dynasty painter (died 1772)
 Zhang Zongcang, Chinese Qing dynasty painter (died 1756)
 probable – Li Shan, Chinese painter (died 1756)

Deaths
 January 2 – Frederik de Moucheron, Dutch Golden Age landscape painter (born 1633)
 January 17 – Carlo Dolci, Italian painter of chiefly sacred subjects (born 1616)
 February 5 – Matthias Rauchmiller, German sculptor active in Vienna (born 1645)
 May – Jacques d'Arthois, Flemish Baroque painter specializing in landscapes (born 1613)
 June 25 – Simon Ushakov, Russian painter (born 1626)
 July 11 – Michel Anguier, French sculptor (born 1612)
 date unknown
 Antonio Busca, Italian painter active in Lombardy (born 1625)
 Carlo Cesio, Italian painter active in Rome (born 1626)
 Nicolas Cochin, French draughtsman and engraver (born 1610)
 Giovanni Battista Marmi, Italian painter (born 1659)
 Pieter Pietersz Nedek, Dutch Golden Age painter (born 1616)
 Antonio Raggi, Italian sculptor (born 1624)
 Dirk Stoop, Dutch Golden Age painter (born 1615)

 
Years of the 17th century in art
1680s in art